Dudley Anthony Guglielmo, Sr. (April 21, 1909 – July 30, 2005), was the Louisiana insurance commissioner from 1964 to 1972.

References

1909 births
2005 deaths
Politicians from Baton Rouge, Louisiana
American people of Italian descent
American businesspeople in insurance
Louisiana insurance commissioners
Louisiana Democrats
20th-century American politicians